The 2018 Bill Beaumont County Championship Division 3 was the 14th version of the competition that is part of the annual English rugby union County Championship, organised by the RFU for the tier 3 English counties.  Each county drew its players from rugby union clubs from the fifth tier and below of the English rugby union league system.  The counties were divided into two regional pools (east/west) with the winners of each pool meeting in the final at the Athletic Ground in Richmond, London - a change from previous seasons, where the final was held at Twickenham Stadium.  Oxfordshire were the reigning champions, having won last year's final.

By the end of the group stage, Essex did just enough by winning two tight games to top Pool 1, while Dorset & Wilts managed to win Pool 2 on bonus points despite losing their final game against Berkshire.  In the final held at the Athletic Ground,  Dorset & Wilts overcame Essex 24 points to 22 to claim their third Division 3 title and first since 2011.  Based on results over the two years, Essex (north) and Sussex (south) were promoted to the 2019 Bill Beaumont County Championship Division 2.

Competition format

The competition format is two regional group stages (west & east) with three teams in each group, each playing two games (one home, one away).  Changes to the 2018 competition see a reduction in teams from seven to six as Notts, Lincs & Derbyshire have decided not to take part this season.  At the end of the pool stage the top teams with the best record from each pool advance to the final held on 27 May 2018 at the Athletic Ground in Richmond, London.  

A continuation from the 2017 competition is that promotion/relegation occurs every two seasons instead of one, with points accumulated over the two seasons (2017 and 2018) taken into consideration.  The two highest ranked counties (one from the north/one from the south) will be promoted into the 2019 Bill Beaumont County Championship Division 2 competition, replacing the lowest ranked aggregate sides who drop down into division 3.  As this is the lowest ranked tier in the county championships there is no relegation.

Participating counties and ground locations

Group stage

Division 3 Pool 1 (East)

Round 1

Round 2

Round 3

Division 3 Pool 2 (West)

Round 1

Round 2

Round 3

Final

Promotion aggregate table

In order to determine promotion to the 2019 Bill Beaumont County Championship Division 2, results from the 2017 and 2018 Division 3 competitions will be combined, with the highest ranked sides from each group being  promoted.  They will be replaced by the lowest ranked teams from the 2017 and 2018 Division 2 competitions.  Note that Notts, Lincs & Derbyshire dropped out of the 2018 competition having played in 2017.  This means that any results between them and the other sides in Division 3 East have been annulled and do not count towards promotion.

Individual statistics
 Note that points scorers includes tries as well as conversions, penalties and drop goals.  Appearance figures also include coming on as substitutes (unused substitutes not included).  Statistics will also include final.

Top points scorers

Top try scorers

Competition records

Team
Largest home win — 49 points
76 - 27 Oxfordshire at home to Buckinghamshire on 5 May 2018
Largest away win — 6 points
21 – 15 Essex away to Buckinghamshire on 19 May 2018
Most points scored — 76 points
76 - 27 Oxfordshire at home to Buckinghamshire on 5 May 2018
Most tries in a match — 12
Oxfordshire at home to Buckinghamshire on 5 May 2018
Most conversions in a match — 8
Oxfordshire at home to Buckinghamshire on 5 May 2018
Most penalties in a match — 2
Essex at home to Oxfordshire on 12 May 2018
Most drop goals in a match — 0

Players

Most points in a match — 23
 Sam Baker for Dorset & Wilts away to Berkshire on 19 May 2018
Most tries in a match — 3
 Tommy Gray for Oxfordshire at home to Buckinghamshire on 5 May 2018
Most conversions in a match — 8
 Ed Phillips for Oxfordshire at home to Buckinghamshire on 5 May 2018
Most penalties in a match — 2
 Bradley Burr for Essex at home to Oxfordshire on 12 May 2018

Notes

See also
 English rugby union system
 Rugby union in England

References

External links
 NCA Rugby

2018
2017–18 County Championship